Juan Gabriel (A.K.A El Alma Joven Vol. II) (English: The Young Soul Volume II) is the second studio album by Juan Gabriel, released in 1972.

Track listing

References 

1972 albums
Juan Gabriel albums
RCA Records albums